José Lucas do Carmo da Silva (born 2 March 1970) is an East Timorese politician, marine biologist and academic, and a member of the Fretilin political party. He is the incumbent Minister of Tourism, Trade and Industry, serving since June 2020 under the VIII Constitutional Government of East Timor led by Taur Matan Ruak.

Early life and career
From 1990 to 1993, Silva completed a marine and fisheries science training program at Sekolah Tinggi Ilmu Kelautan dan Perikanan in Jakarta, Indonesia.

From  1993 to 1996, Silva was a technical officer in the Fisheries Office. From 1996 to 1998, he studied marine and fisheries science at the University of Brawijaya (UB) in Malang, Indonesia; he graduated with an engineering degree. From 1999 to 2001, he served as an officer at the United Nations High Commissioner for Refugees (UNHCR) office in East Timor, and then, from 2001 to 2003, he studied at Heriot-Watt University in Edinburgh, graduating with a Master of Science degree in Natural Resource Development and Protection.

From 2003 to 2005, Silva worked as the National Program Officer of the Japan International Cooperation Agency (JICA) in East Timor with responsibility for the planning, implementation and monitoring of projects in the countryside and for the development of agriculture. Additionally, he was the coordinator of the trilateral cooperation between East Timor, Japan and the Philippines under the leadership of JICA for the development of alternative agricultural products. He also served as research coordinator for a study on water management in the region around the North Laclo River.

In 2006 and 2007, Silva was responsible for the national census of 2010, for coordinating research on the assessment of population development, and for projects on gender equality, such as the law against domestic violence. Among other things, he worked with the United Nations Population Fund (UNFPA). From May to September 2008, Silva was environmental advisor for the Pipeline Task Force team with responsibility for environmental and socio-economic issues related to the potential impact of the development of the oil industry on the south coast of East Timor.

Between 2008 and 2013, Silva earned a PhD in environmental sciences majoring in marine biology at Heriot-Watt University. In 2014, he worked as a marine and fisheries expert, and in 2015 as an ecosystem specialist for a United Nations Development Programme (UNDP) project on shoreline protection. At the private João Saldanha University (JSU) in Dili, founded in 2015, Silva was a senior researcher and lecturer. From the establishment of the Faculty of Fisheries and Marine Biology at the National University of East Timor (UNTL) in 2017, Silva was its Director.

Political career
Following a change in the governing coalition, and the admission of Fretilin to the VIII Constitutional Government, Silva was sworn in as Minister of Tourism, Trade and Industry on 24 June 2020.

References

External links 

Fretilin politicians
Government ministers of East Timor
Tourism, trade and industry ministers of East Timor
Living people
1970 births
21st-century East Timorese politicians